The 1998–99 Maltese Premier League was the 19th season of the Maltese Premier League, and the 84th season of top-tier football in Malta. It was contested by 10 teams, and Valletta F.C. won the championship.

League table

Results

Matches 1–18

Matches 19–27

References
Malta – List of final tables (RSSSF)

Maltese Premier League seasons
Malta
1998–99 in Maltese football